Hieracium parryi is a North American plant species in the tribe Cichorieae within the family Asteraceae. It grows only in the western United States, in southwestern Oregon and northeastern California. It is commonly known as woollyweed.

One stalk can produce 1–12 flower heads in a flat-topped array. Each head has 30–60 yellow ray flowers but no disc flowers. Its habitats include grassy slopes and brush openings.

References

External links
Calphotos photo gallery, University of California

parryi
Flora of California
Flora of Oregon
Plants described in 1922
Flora without expected TNC conservation status